2018 Renofa Yamaguchi FC season.

J2 League

References

External links
 J.League official site

Renofa Yamaguchi FC
Renofa Yamaguchi FC seasons